Two ships of the United States Navy have been named Firm:

 , was redesignated PC-1602 on 1 June 1944
 , was launched 15 April 1953 and later redesignated MSO-444

United States Navy ship names